The 1973 All-Africa Games was the Second Edition of the African Games where Volleyball was contested, but only for men and it was held in Lagos, Nigeria, with Eight national teams has participated.

Teams

Final ranking

References

Volleyball at the African Games
Volleyball, Men
African Games, Men
1973 in African sport
International volleyball competitions hosted by Nigeria